Gerard "Gerry" Benjamin Hewson, OAM (born 5 June 1958) is an Australian former Paralympic wheelchair basketballer.  He has coached wheelchair basketball on the national and international level in Australia.
Gerry is now studying horticulture at TAFE and is the producer of Gerard Benjamin honey from Cedar Brush Creek.

Personal
Hewson was born on 5 June 1958 in the New South Wales town of Young.

In 2007 a nude picture of Hewson and his pregnant wife was displayed at the Museum of Sex in New York City as part of an exhibit called "Intimate Encounters", that focused on the sex lives of disabled athletes.  The photograph was published by Time Out New York in its section "This week in New York".

Playing career
Hewson was a member of the Australian men's national wheelchair basketball team, competing at four Paralympic Games from 1988 to 2000. He won a gold medal as a member of the team at the 1996 Summer Paralympics, for which he received a Medal of the Order of Australia.

Hewson competed in the National Wheelchair Basketball League (NWBL) in 2001. That year, he was named as the Low Point MVP for the league.  In 1999, 2000 and 2001, He was also named as part of the league's All Star Five.

Coaching career

Hewson was the head coach for the Women's National Wheelchair Basketball League (WNWBL) Sydney Uni Wheelkings in 2011. He was coach of the NWBL's West Sydney Razorbacks from 2004 to 2006.  During that time, he helped guide the team to championships during the 2004 and 2005 seasons. In 2006, Hewson was the head coach when the team competed at the Joseph F. Lyttle World Basketball Challenge and the 2006 Gold Cup. When he selected the athletes to make up the 2006 Australian side, he chose seven players who were under the age of twenty-five.

In 2002, Hewson was named assistant coach of the Australian women's national wheelchair team, known as the Gliders. It finished third at the 2002 Gold Cup. In 2003, he was named the team's head coach. He coached the team when they won a silver medal at the 2004 Summer Paralympics in Athens, and to the bronze medal at the 2008 Summer Paralympics in Beijing. In 2011, he also served as the coach of the women's U25 national wheelchair basketball team in the U25 Women's World Championship of Basketball in St. Catharines, Canada. The team won silver at the tournament.

Influence and legacy
Hewson has inspired several Paralympians, including Kylie Gauci.  Melanie Domaschenz considers Hewson to be one of the most important figures in her sporting career in terms of helping her to accomplish her sport related goals.

Recognition

In 2000, Hewson received an Australian Sports Medal. In 2008, the National Wheelchair Basketball League recognised his efforts at promoting the league and the sport of wheelchair basketball by naming him a life member alongside Michael Callahan and Errol Hyde. In 2019, he was  inducted into the New South Wales Basketball Hall of Fame.

References

Paralympic wheelchair basketball players of Australia
Paralympic gold medalists for Australia
Wheelchair category Paralympic competitors
Wheelchair basketball players at the 1988 Summer Paralympics
Wheelchair basketball players at the 1992 Summer Paralympics
Wheelchair basketball players at the 1996 Summer Paralympics
Wheelchair basketball players at the 2000 Summer Paralympics
Medalists at the 1996 Summer Paralympics
Paralympic wheelchair basketball coaches
Paralympic coaches of Australia
Coaches at the 2004 Summer Paralympics
Coaches at the 2008 Summer Paralympics
Recipients of the Medal of the Order of Australia
Recipients of the Australian Sports Medal
People from Young, New South Wales
Sportsmen from New South Wales
1958 births
Living people
Paralympic silver medalists for Australia
Paralympic bronze medalists for Australia
Paralympic medalists in wheelchair basketball